The Women's javelin throw competition at the 2012 Summer Olympics in London, United Kingdom. The event was held at the Olympic Stadium on 7–9 August. Each athlete receives three throws in the qualifying round. All who achieve the qualifying distance progress to the final. If less than twelve athletes achieve this mark, then the twelve furthest throwing athletes reach the final. Each finalist is allowed three throws in last round, with the top eight athletes after that point being given three further attempts.

The qualifying round was mostly automatic marks.  Eight athletes hit the auto mark in their first legal attempt.  It took 60.11 to make the final.

The final was dominated by defending champion and world record holder Barbora Špotáková who took the lead on the first throw of the competition, a lead she would never relinquish.  On the second throw of the competition Sunette Viljoen got off her best throw, which would put her in third place.  Later in the round, Christina Obergföll got off her only legal throw, which turned out to be the silver medal throw.  Each round Špotáková kept putting out long throws, but didn't improve.  In the fourth round, Linda Stahl passed Viljoen to move into bronze medal position.  Then Špotáková let loose the winner, her 69.55—more than 2.5 metres further than her previous bests—which won the competition by 4.39 metres.  None of the medalists even got a legal throw in the final two rounds.  Any one of Špotáková's four legal throws would have won the gold medal.

Schedule

All times are British Summer Time (UTC+1)

Records
, the existing World and Olympic records were as follows.

Results

Qualifying round

Qual. rule: qualification standard 62.00m (Q) or at least best 12 qualified (q).

Final

References

Athletics at the 2012 Summer Olympics
Javelin throw at the Olympics
2012 in women's athletics
Women's events at the 2012 Summer Olympics